Jon Golding (born 6 May 1982 in Morpeth, Northumberland, England) is a rugby union player for Newcastle Falcons in the RFU Championship, playing at the loose-head prop position.

Club career
He has previously played for Rotherham and Northampton Saints. Golding joined the Newcastle Falcons for the start of the 2006–07 season.

In March 2009, Golding signed a new contract with Newcastle.

International career
He has represented England at under-19 level. Golding made his debut for the England Saxons on 9 February 2008, against Italy A.

After strong form in the early part of the 2009–10 season, Golding was a contender to be in the senior England squad for the 2010 Six Nations Championship. A broken rib sustained against London Wasps kept him out for the duration of the tournament.

Golding was called up to the senior England squad for the 2010 tour of Australia.

References

External links
Newcastle Falcons profile

1982 births
Living people
English rugby union players
Newcastle Falcons players
Northampton Saints players
People educated at Millfield
People from Morpeth, Northumberland
Rotherham Titans players
Rugby union players from Northumberland
Rugby union props